Anatoliy Didenko (born 9 June 1982) is a retired Ukrainian footballer.

External links
 
 

1982 births
Living people
Sportspeople from Mykolaiv
Ukrainian footballers
Ukrainian expatriate footballers
Expatriate footballers in Russia
Ukrainian expatriate sportspeople in Russia
FC Enerhiya Yuzhnoukrainsk players
MFC Mykolaiv players
FC Amkar Perm players
FC Chornomorets Odesa players
FC Metalist Kharkiv players
FC Hoverla Uzhhorod players
FC Zorya Luhansk players
Russian Premier League players
Ukrainian Premier League players
Ukrainian First League players
Ukrainian Second League players
FC Volyn Lutsk players
Association football forwards
FC Zhemchuzhyna Odesa players
FC Mariupol players